Cristian Zermatten (born 31 October 1974 in Argentina) is an Argentinean retired footballer who last played for CSyD Tristán Suárez in his home country.

Career

Zermatten started his senior career with Argentinos Juniors. In 1998, he signed for Club Universidad Nacional in the Mexican Liga MX, where he made over twenty-eight league appearances and scored one goal. After that, he played for Club Atlético Colón, Club Atlético Huracán, C.D. Cuenca, Club Universitario de Deportes, The Strongest, Club Bolívar, Club Nacional de Football, Club Atlético Nueva Chicago, Talleres de Córdoba, Ferro Carril Oeste, and CSyD Tristán Suárez.

References

External links 
 Cristian Zermatten: "There was never a header or anything with Felipe Ramos Rizo" 
 Zermatten: Soccer does not end 
 The race does not end for a suspended year: Cristian Zermatten
 For Cristian Zermatten, he never hit Felipe Ramos Rizo 
 "We players pay for broken dishes"

CSyD Tristán Suárez footballers
1974 births
Association football midfielders
Argentinos Juniors footballers
Club Universidad Nacional footballers
Club Atlético Colón footballers
Club Atlético Huracán footballers
C.D. Cuenca footballers
Club Universitario de Deportes footballers
The Strongest players
Club Bolívar players
Club Nacional de Football players
Talleres de Córdoba footballers
Ferro Carril Oeste footballers
Living people
Argentine footballers